Rüdiger Wenzel (born 3 June 1953) is a German retired professional footballer, who played as a forward. He scored 91 goals in 300 matches in the Bundesliga.

Career statistics

Honours
Fortuna Düsseldorf
 DFB-Pokal: 1979–80

FC St. Pauli
 Oberliga Nord: 1985–86

Individual
Goal of the Month: March 1989

References

External links 
 
 

1953 births
Living people
Sportspeople from Lübeck
German footballers
Association football forwards
Bundesliga players
2. Bundesliga players
VfB Lübeck players
FC St. Pauli players
Eintracht Frankfurt players
Fortuna Düsseldorf players